Henrik Kullberg (27 January 1891, in Ruotsinpyhtää – 4 December 1953) was a Finnish farmer and politician. He served as Deputy Minister of Agriculture from 17 November 1953 until his death only a few weeks later, on 4 December 1953. He was a member of the Parliament of Finland from 1927 to 1930 and again from 1933 until his death, representing the Swedish People's Party of Finland.

References

1891 births
1953 deaths
People from Ruotsinpyhtää
People from Uusimaa Province (Grand Duchy of Finland)
Swedish-speaking Finns
Swedish People's Party of Finland politicians
Ministers of Agriculture of Finland
Members of the Parliament of Finland (1927–29)
Members of the Parliament of Finland (1929–30)
Members of the Parliament of Finland (1933–36)
Members of the Parliament of Finland (1936–39)
Members of the Parliament of Finland (1939–45)
Members of the Parliament of Finland (1945–48)
Members of the Parliament of Finland (1948–51)
Members of the Parliament of Finland (1951–54)
Finnish people of World War II